La Macaza is a municipality and village in the province of Quebec, Canada. The village is located in the Laurentian Mountains, in the Laurentian region, in Antoine-Labelle Regional County Municipality. Its population was 1094 in the 2021 Canadian census.

It is home to the La Macaza – Mont Tremblant International Airport that serves the region. A medium security federal penitentiary is located next to the airport.

There is a covered bridge that runs over the Macaza River, built in 1904, and is an international tourist attraction. There are many lakes and beaches in the municipality.

According to the Geographic Names of the Province of Quebec (1921), "Macaza is the name of a native chief from the region", possibly the name of an old Amerindian who camped on the shores of Lake Macaza.

History
Although indigenous peoples had lived in the area, the first European settlers arrived circa 1866. In 1904, La Macaza was established when the parish of Notre-Dame-du-Divin-Pasteur (Our Lady of Divine Shepherd) was founded. In 1930, the municipality was formed when its territory was detached from the municipality of Marchand (now part of Rivière-Rouge).

It was first a farming community and later on its inhabitants worked mostly in logging, but today La Macaza receives a flood of vacationers each year.

On December 18, 2002, La Macaza was merged into the new town of Rivière-Rouge when the Québec government forced certain province-wide mergers that were alleged to save citizens money. In 2004 the residents voted to separate from the city and on January 1, 2006, the municipality was reinstated.

Demographics

Mother tongue:
 English as first language: 2%
 French as first language: 92%
 English and French as first language: 1%
 Other as first language: 6%

Local government

List of former mayors:

 Christian Bélisle (2006–2013)
 Céline Beauregard (2013–2021)
 Yves Bélanger (2021–present)

Education

Sainte Agathe Academy (of the Sir Wilfrid Laurier School Board) in Sainte-Agathe-des-Monts serves English-speaking students in this community for both elementary and secondary levels.

See also
List of municipalities in Quebec

References

External links
 

Incorporated places in Laurentides
Municipalities in Quebec